Fred Cray (born 1957) is an American multimedia artist based in Brooklyn, New York whose first solo show, in 2000, of his photographs were described by The New York Times as "lush, gaudy and ethereal Technicolor spirit photographs", and whose works are now contained in the collections of many major art institutions, including the Brooklyn Museum, the Center for Photography at Woodstock, New York Public Library, and the George Eastman Museum.

Life, art, accomplishments 

Cray was born in Evanston, Illinois and is a graduate of The Hotchkiss School in Lakeville, Connecticut.  He earned a B.A. degree from Middlebury College in 1979, attended the Skowhegan School of Painting and Sculpture, and did graduate studies in painting at the Yale School of Art.

In 2003 he was awarded a Guggenheim Fellowship and shortly thereafter received a Pollock–Krasner award. In 2008 he was awarded a Peter S. Reed Foundation grant.

Cray's  "two-minute portraits" are large-scale self-portraits, inquiring into the persistence of the photographic image.  His series of unique collage prints, "travel diaries", are narrative/impressionist tours of the world and his mind.

His ongoing Unique Photographs project begun in 2008 has led to over 26,000 one-off photographs being placed around the world for people to find, sometimes furtively and often in the open. Some of these placements can be seen on the Instagram feed. Several books relating to the Unique Photographs project have been published including Unique Photographs, Changing The Guard, Conversations, and Cray Cray. Additional Unique Photographs are made for the book projects and exhibitions.

Since 2008, Cray has left or hidden over 26,000 unique photographs in New York, the United States and different parts of the world including Europe, Asia, Australia and South Africa. review Fred Cray-Unique Photographs/Photobookstore Magazine 1 November 2013

Cray is represented by Janet Borden Inc.

Publications

References

External links 

 
 Fred on Revel in New York
 Instagram
 Janet Borden Inc

1957 births
American photographers
Hotchkiss School alumni
Middlebury College alumni
Yale School of Art alumni
Living people